Marcello Fiorentini (born 29 August 1980) is an Italian football player currently playing for the FC Hanau 93.

Career
Marcello Fiorentini played for SS Lazio in the late 1990s, however his career declined and he ended up in the Serie C and Serie D with A.C. Palazzolo 1913 and Delfino Pescara 1936. He was signed by Newcastle Jets manager Branko Culina along with former Chinese International Zhang Shuo after a week-long trial in which he impressed significantly. After one season at the Jets, Fiorentini failed to make an impact and was released.

References

External links
 Newcastle Jets profile
 Translation of profile

Italian footballers
S.S. Lazio players
Delfino Pescara 1936 players
Newcastle Jets FC players
Association football midfielders
Living people
A-League Men players
Expatriate soccer players in Australia
Italian expatriates in Australia
1980 births
U.S. 1913 Seregno Calcio players
Viktoria Aschaffenburg players
SV Heimstetten players
Italian expatriate footballers
Expatriate footballers in Germany
Italian expatriate sportspeople in Germany